Çiftlikköy is a village in the Tut District of Adıyaman Province in Turkey. The village is populated by Turkmens and had a population of 231 in 2021.

References

Villages in Tut District